Southern Cross Healthcare may refer to:
Southern Cross Healthcare Group (New Zealand), a health insurance and hospital operator
Southern Cross Healthcare (United Kingdom), a former operator of rest and care homes